Lesley Brett (born 15 March 1968) is a former New Zealand rugby union player. She made her Black Ferns debut at RugbyFest 1990 against Netherlands. Brett competed at the 1991 Women's Rugby World Cup; she scored a hat-trick in their game against Wales.

Personal life 
Brett is the mother of former Crusaders and Blues fly-half, Stephen Brett. She was married to former All Black, Victor Simpson.

References

External links 

 Black Ferns Profile

1968 births
Living people
New Zealand female rugby union players
New Zealand women's international rugby union players